Jettatore may refer to:
 Jettatore (1938 film), an Argentine musical drama film
 Jettatore (1919 film), a German silent crime film